The Tun Fatimah class is an offshore patrol vessel (OPV) built by the Malaysian company THHE-Destini with the assistance of Damen company from the Netherlands based on the design of the Damen 1800-class OPV vessel. THHE-Destini is a joint venture between two local company which is THHE and the  builder, Destini Berhad. The class is also known as the Damen 1800-class offshore patrol vessel and the class changed names after the first ship of the class, KM Tun Fatimah. A total of three ships of this class are planned to be built.

Development

The Damen 1800 OPV contract was awarded to THHE-Destini local company in early 2017. The ship contract is worth RM738.9 million and the construction started in December 2017. The first ship will be completed in mid-2020.
The main armament of the ship are one 1 × 30 mm Aselsan SMASH  RWS and light defensive weapons such as 12.7 mm and 7.62 mm machine guns. She also has a complement of 46 crew. To fulfill the patrol duty, she also able to operate one medium-sized helicopter and one unmanned aerial vehicle. All ships will be named after female warriors of Malaysia.

Ships of the class

References

Patrol vessels of Malaysia
Proposed ships